Face Down is the second studio album by Canadian rock band Serial Joe. The album features the hit single "Mistake", which was featured on MuchMusic's Big Shiny Tunes 4. The album was certified Gold on September 3, 1999.

Track listing
 "Should Have Been Mine" - 3:24
 "Deep" - 3:08
 "Mistake" - 3:08
 "Face Down" - 3:38
 "Dragon On My Shoulder" - 2:51
 "Shallow" - 3:22
 "Push" - 2:47
 "Sanity" - 2:55
 "Centipede" - 3:13
 "Confused" - 3:22
 "Outrage" - 3:02
 "Denial" - 2:52

References

1999 albums
Serial Joe albums
Albums recorded at Metalworks Studios